Betty Harris (born September 9, 1939 in Orlando, Florida, United States) is an American soul singer. Her recording career in the 1960s produced three hit singles that made the U.S. Billboard R&B and Billboard Hot 100 charts: "Cry to Me" (1963), "His Kiss" (1964) and "Nearer to You" (1967). However, her reputation among soul music connoisseurs far exceeds her commercial success of the 1960s, and her recordings for the Jubilee and Sansu record labels are highly sought after in the 2000s by fans of Southern Soul, Northern soul and deep soul.

Career
In 1963, after being in the music business for a few years, Betty Harris recorded a slowed down version of Solomon Burke's hit of the year before, "Cry to Me", produced by the original record's producer, Bert Berns, and released on the Jubilee record label. Taken at a slower pace, Harris's rendition turned the song into a Billboard Hot 100 number 23 hit, with a corresponding number 10 listing on the R&B chart, and it became a deep soul classic. A total of three further singles including a reissue of "Cry to Me" were released on Jubilee, also produced by Bert Berns, with "His Kiss", which was released on January 4, 1964, another deep soul ballad, reaching the lower part of the Billboard Pop and R&B charts.

In 1964, Betty Harris switched record labels to Sansu, a New Orleans label, where she was produced by Allen Toussaint. Her recording with Sansu produced ten singles. Of those, only "Nearer to You", an atmospheric, dramatic soul ballad, now considered one of the milestones of deep soul, achieved U.S. national chart success (Billboard number 85). However, practically all of her recordings for Sansu, uptempo tunes and ballads alike, featuring Toussaint's raw yet sophisticated Southern soul arrangements behind Harris's rich, distinctive vocal, are considered prime specimens of the classic soul era; some notable recordings were "I'm Evil Tonight", a beat ballad favored in Northern soul circles; "I Don't Want to Hear It", "Show It" and "Twelve Red Roses", stirring up-tempo tracks; "Can't Last Much Longer" and "What'd I Do Wrong", emotive deep soul ballads.

Harris retired from performing in 1970 to raise a family.
 
All of the Sansu recordings were compiled into an album released in the UK (but not the U.S.) in 1969, called Soul Perfection, an album which, in its vinyl format, although not extremely rare, commands relatively high prices of $200 to $300 today.

A comprehensive CD compilation of Harris's recordings, titled Soul Perfection Plus, was released in 1999 by the UK re-release label, West Side.

In 2005, Harris returned to the music industry after a long absence. Betty has been in a decades long copyright battle over the ownership of her music. Allen Toussaint and Marshall Sehorn never paid her the royalties due her, and she owns the sound recording copyrights for all the songs she recorded with Sansu, including "Nearer to You."  

She has made several public appearances in the U.S. and Europe, including the 2007 Porretta Soul Festival in Italy, and has recorded a new album, Intuition.

Harris toured Australia in 2006 and appeared on the TV show RocKwiz, where she performed "Cry to Me", and a duet of "Love Lots of Lovin'" with the Australian singer John Paul Young.

Discography

U.S. singles

Albums

Vinyl compilations

Compilation CDs

References

External links
2004 Interview with Betty Harris
Betty Harris article on the Funky 16 Corners web site
The Lost Soul Queen, article on Soulexpress Radio Web site at Allmusic website

American women singers
1939 births
American soul musicians
Jubilee Records artists
Living people
Singers from Orlando, Florida
Rhythm and blues musicians from New Orleans
Singers from Louisiana
21st-century American women